"Sweet Love" is a song by American R&B singer and songwriter Anita Baker from her second studio album, Rapture (1986). It was written by Anita Baker, Louis A. Johnson, and Gary Bias, and produced by Michael J. Powell. It was released in July 1986, as the album's first single.

The song was Baker's first big hit single, peaking at number two on the US Billboard R&B chart, number three on the US Billboard Adult Contemporary chart, and number eight on the US Billboard Hot 100 in the fall of 1986. In the UK, it reached number 13 on the UK Singles Chart and peaked at number 21 on Canada's Top Singles chart.

"Sweet Love" won the Grammy Award for Best R&B Song at the 29th Annual Grammy Awards (1987).

Composition
"Sweet Love" was originally published in the key of B major, and is written in common time with a tempo of 89 beats per minute. Baker's vocals span from E3 to D5.

Critical reception
Daryl Easlea of the BBC said that Baker's voice "rings like a bell", and that "Sweet Love" is one of the three most memorable tracks on Rapture. He felt that the lyrics might have sounded trite if sung by a different artist, but that Baker imbued them with "so much passion and wonderment"  that they sound like "old love sonnets" brought back to life.

Awards
Baker won two Grammys at the 29th Annual Grammy Awards (1987). "Sweet Love" was selected as Best R&B Song, earning her (along with Gary Bias and Louis Johnson) a songwriting award. Also, the album containing this song, Rapture, won in the category Best Female R&B Vocal performance.

Personnel 
 Lead vocals: Anita Baker
 Backing vocals: Anita Baker, Jim Gilstrap, Bunny Hall and Daryl Phinnessee
 Drums: Ricky Lawson
 Percussion: Paulinho da Costa
 Bass: Freddie Washington
 Guitar: Greg Moore
 Keyboards, arrangements: Sir Gant

Track listings
7" single  
 "Sweet Love" – 4:26
 "Watch Your Step" – 4:56

Limited edition gatefold - 7" single   
7" single 1:
 "Sweet Love" – 4:26
 "No One in the World" – 4:10
7" single 2:
 "Same Ole Love (365 Days a Year)" (Live) – 4:01
 "You Bring Me Joy" (Live) – 4:31

7" single  
 "Sweet Love" – 4:26
 "No One in the World" – 4:10

Chart performance

Weekly charts

Year-end charts

Other versions

M-Beat version
British jungle musician M-Beat covered the song in 1994 with singer Nazlyn on vocals. This version peaked at No. 18 on the UK Singles Chart.

Fierce version
British R&B female trio Fierce covered the song in 1999 which appears on their debut album Right Here Right Now. It was released as a single in 2000 with new production by Stargate, titled "Sweet Love 2K". This version peaked at number three on the UK Singles Chart.

References

External links
 [ AMG Allmusic]

1985 songs
1986 singles
Anita Baker songs
1994 singles
M-Beat songs
2000 singles
Fierce songs
Songs written by Anita Baker
Soul ballads
Contemporary R&B ballads
1980s ballads
Elektra Records singles
Song recordings produced by Michael J. Powell
Quiet storm songs